The WNBL Coach of the Year Award is an annual Women's National Basketball League (WNBL) award given since the 1987 WNBL season.

Winners

References 

Coach
Basketball coaching awards